Jones College was a private college in Jacksonville, Florida. Founded in 1918, the college was non-profit and had an undergraduate body of roughly 350 students. It offered courses in business, education, management, medical assistant training, computer science and general studies. The school was not regionally accredited, although it was nationally accredited by the Accrediting Council for Independent Colleges and Schools (ACICS).

On December 12, 2016, John King Jr., the United States Secretary of Education, finalized the process of revoking the U.S. Department of Education's recognition of ACICS as an accreditor. Subsequently, Jones College announced it would close on December 31, 2017. Its last classes were held in August 2017.

Campuses

The college's main campus was located in the Arlington neighborhood of Jacksonville at the foot of the Mathews Bridge. The school also offered distance learning, and had a student to faculty ratio of 12:1 in on-campus classrooms.

History
Jones College, originally Jones Business College, held its first classes in a private home. It later became the first business college to have a student dormitory.

The school had national accreditation from the Accrediting Council for Independent Colleges and Schools (ACICS). It was certified to operate in Florida by the Commission for Independent Education (CIE) and approved by CIE to grant degrees at both the associate's level and the bachelor's level of academic study. By the end of its operation, Jones College offered degrees in business and information technology, as well as medical, legal and educational fields.

Jones College students were to transfer to Keiser University to complete their coursework.

Radio
Jones College Radio was a non-commercial broadcast from the campus on station WKTZ-FM (90.9 MHz), which was live 24 hours a day. The programming content was easy listening, branded as "Beautiful Music". The station began as an AM station in 1964 and then switched to FM in 1973. The station is played in many businesses and professional offices on the First Coast instead of commercial muzak, and can be accessed via the station's online website. The college also owned a student run radio station, WFAM (91.1 FM) and an AM carrier radio station WJCR. WFAM had a classical music format in the morning (9-12 p.m.) Top 40 in the afternoon (12-6 p.m.) and jazz until sign off. The station was sold and the beautiful music format was replaced with Christian radio.

Jones College Radio continues to operate online.

References

External links 
 Official site

Jones College
Jones College
Universities and colleges in Jacksonville, Florida
Colleges accredited by the Accrediting Council for Independent Colleges and Schools
Arlington, Jacksonville
Universities and colleges in the Jacksonville metropolitan area
1918 establishments in Florida
2017 disestablishments in Florida
Defunct private universities and colleges in Florida